The 1994 All-Pacific-10 Conference football team consists of American football players chosen by various organizations for All-Pacific-10 Conference teams for the 1994 Pacific-10 Conference football season. The conference coaches selected an All-Pac-12 team and also selected Washington running back Napoleon Kaufman as the Pac-10 player of the year. 

The Pac-10 champion 1994 Oregon Ducks football team led with five players who received first-team honors, including quarterback Danny O'Neil and all-purpose player Ricky Whittle. Arizona, UCLA, Washington, and Washington State each had four players who received first-team honors.

Offensive selections

Quarterbacks
 Danny O'Neil, Oregon (Coaches-1)

Running backs
 Napoleon Kaufman , Washington (Coaches-1)
 Ontiwaun Carter, Arizona St. (Coaches-1)

Wide receivers
 Justin Armour, Stanford (Coaches-1)
 Keyshawn Johnson , USC (Coaches-1)

Tight ends
 Mark Bruener, Washington (Coaches-1)

Offensive linemen
 Tony Boselli, USC (Coaches-1)
 Jonathan Ogden, UCLA (Coaches-1)
 Frank Garcia, Washington (Coaches-1)
 Warner Smith, Arizona (Coaches-1)
 Mike Flanagan, UCLA (Coaches-1)

Defensive selections

Defensive tackles
 Chad Eaton, Washington St. (Coaches-1)
 Dan Sasa, Washington St. (Coaches-1)

Defensive linemen
 DeWayne Patterson, Washington St. (Coaches-1)
 Tedy Bruschi, Arizona (Coaches-1)

Linebackers
 Jerrott Willard, California (Coaches-1)
 Mark Fields, Washington St. (Coaches-1)
 Sean Harris, Arizona (Coaches-1)
 Donnie Edwards, UCLA (Coaches-1)

Defensive backs
 Chad Cota, Oregon (Coaches-1)
 Lawyer Milloy, Washington (Coaches-1)
 Alex Molden, Oregon (Coaches-1)

Special teams

Placekickers
 Steve McLaughlin, Arizona (Coaches-1)

Punters
 Darren Schager, UCLA (Coaches-1)

Return specialists/All purpose 
 Herman O'Berry, Oregon (Coaches-1)
 Ricky Whittle, Oregon (Coaches-1)

Key
Coaches = selected by the conference coaches

See also
1994 College Football All-America Team

References

All-Pacific-10 Conference Football Team
All-Pac-12 Conference football teams